GIS (Geographic information system)  is a computer-based system to analyse and present spatial data.

GIS or Gis may also refer to:

Business 
 General Mills, an American food manufacturer
 Global Investors Summit, a business conference in Indore, India
 Green investment scheme
 Grey Island Systems International, a Canadian company
 Gunawan Iron and Steel, an Indonesian steel company

Government 
 Georgian Intelligence Service, the national intelligence agency of Georgia
 General Intelligence Service (Sudan), the Sudanese intelligence agency since 2019
 Ghana Immigration Service
 , a special force counter-terrorist unit of the Italian Carabinieri
 Government Information Services, a Hong Kong government department
 Guaranteed Income Supplement, a Canadian supplement to Old Age Security
 Integrated Security Unit, in Canada
 Special Intervention Group, of Algeria

Language 
 Giš, a cuneiform sign
 GIŠ (wood Sumerogram), a cuneiform determinative prefix for items made of wood
 North Giziga language

Places 
 Gis, Iran
 Greenland ice sheet

Schools 
 Garden International School, in Kuala Lumpur, Malaysia
 German International School Doha, in Qatar
 German International School New York, in White Plains, New York, United States
 Ghiyasuddin International School, in Malé, Maldives
 Gippsland Independent Schools, in Victoria, Australia
 Goshen Intermediate School, in New York, United States
 Grace International School, in Chiang Mai, Thailand
 Granada Islamic School, in Santa Clara, California, United States 
 Greenoak International School, in Port Harcourt, Rivers State, Nigeria
 Gulf Indian School, in Fahaheel, Kuwait
 Global Indian School, in Ajman, United Arab Emirates

Science and technology 
 Gas imaging spectrometer, an instrument aboard Japan's Advanced Satellite for Cosmology and Astrophysics
 Gas-insulated switchgear
 Generalized iterative scaling
 Genome Institute of Singapore
 Global information system

Other uses 
 Cemetery GIS, a necropolis on the Giza Plateau, Egypt
 G♯ (musical note), German notation Gis
 Gadigal Information Service, which runs Koori Radio in Sydney, Australia
 Gateshead International Stadium, in Tyne and Wear, England
 Gisborne Airport, in New Zealand
 Gis Gelati, an Italian professional cycling team
 Gis Napoli, an Italian amateur basketball team
 Guide International Service, set up by the Girl Guides Association in Britain

See also
 GI (disambiguation)
 Jizz (disambiguation)